Costa Rican Spanish is the form of the Spanish language spoken in Costa Rica. It is one of the dialects of Central American Spanish.

Phonetics
The distinguishing characteristics of Costa Rican phonetics include the following:
 Assibilation of the "double-R" phoneme in some speakers (spelled  word-initially and  intervocalically), especially in rural areas, resulting in a voiced alveolar sibilant—thus   ("clothing"), carro  ("car").
Thus ropa  ("clothing"), carro  ("car") and cuatro  ("four"). Except before a consonant (this does not apply to all speakers) in which case is pronounced as a voiced alveolar trill  [r] . Thus puerta  ("door"), guardar  ("to save"). 
Note: This does not apply to the single-R phoneme which is pronounced as an alveolar tap  [ɾ]  like the rest of Spanish speakers.
 Velarization of word-final  (before a pause or a vowel), i.e. pronunciation as the velar nasal .
It may be aspirated most often at the end of a word and before another word which begins in a vowel, but  still occurs most of the time. Costa Rica's border regions with Nicaragua and Panama show higher rates of -reduction.
In words like  'work' it can barely be heard.

Second person singular pronouns

Usted
Usted is the predominant second person singular pronoun in Costa Rican Spanish. Others use both usted and vos, according to the situation.

Vos
Vos is a second person singular pronoun used by many speakers in certain relationships of familiarity or informal contexts.  Voseo is widely used between friends, family, people of the same age, etc. It is also commonly used in the university context between students. Some adults use vos to address children or juveniles, but other adults address everyone regardless of age or status with usted. Costa Ricans tend to use usted with foreigners.  has become less popular in adults below the age of thirty, as of 2016.

Tú
Tú is occasionally used in Costa Rican Spanish. However, due in part to the influence of Mexican television programming, Costa Ricans are familiar with tuteo, and some television viewers, especially children, have begun to use it in limited contexts. It used to be much rarer, and is often considered not really "Costa Rican." As of 2016, young adults use  as infrequently as do older adults.

Tiquismos 
Costa Ricans are colloquially called "ticos" (based on the frequent use of the diminutive ending -ico following a /t/, as in momentico), and thus colloquial expressions characteristic of Costa Rica are called tiquismos. Tiquismos and pachuquismos are used frequently in Costa Rica. The latter are expressions of popular street Spanish which can be considered vulgar and offensive if used in the wrong context. Many of these words, even when found in a standard Spanish dictionary, do not have the same meaning there as in Costa Rica. Learning colloquial expressions can be a guide to understanding the humor and character of the Costa Rican culture.

Here are some examples of Costa Rican slang. 
 Mae, ese chante es muy tuanis: "Dude, that house is pretty cool".
 Esta panta no me cuadra porque me chima las piernas: "I don’t like these shorts because they chafe my legs".
 ¡Qué taco me dio esa vara!: "That thing really scared me!"

References

Bibliography

External links
Jergas de habla hispana (Spanish dictionary specializing in slang and colloquial expressions, featuring all Spanish-speaking countries, including Costa Rica).

See also
 Latin American Spanish

Central American Spanish
Spanish